WEDE-CD, virtual channel 34 (UHF digital channel 28), branded on-air as MCTV, is a low-powered, Class A religious independent television station serving Chicago, Illinois, United States that is licensed to Arlington Heights. The station is owned by First United. It can also be viewed on WJYS (channel 62)'s tenth digital subchannel.

History

WEDE-CD's beginnings were as a translator station on channel 17 since its inception in 1989. It moved to channel 34 in 1998 and the call letters were rechristened as translator W34CK. The station received Class A status with their new call letters as WEDE-CA in 2005. Channel 34 was once an affiliate of Family Net while also airing some religious programming and infomercials. Around 2008, its programming began to be additionally viewed on WJYS' second digital subchannel.

After the full-power digital transition in June 2009, WEDE-CA began to receive increased signal coverage from its transmitter at Willis Tower since, as a low power station, it was not affected by the digital switchover. In summer of 2014, WEDE-CA extinguished their analog signal on channel 34 and flash cut to digital as WEDE-CD. It currently reaches about 8 million people in the Chicago market and continues to serve its surrounding areas as MCTV.

Digital channels
The station's digital signal is multiplexed:

External links
 

Television stations in Illinois
Television channels and stations established in 1999
1999 establishments in Illinois
Low-power television stations in the United States